The Code on Social Security, 2020 is a code to amend and consolidate the laws relating to social security with the goal to extend social security to all employees and workers either in the organised or unorganised or any other sectors.

The Social Security Code, 2020 brings unorganised sector, gig workers and platform workers under the ambit of social security schemes, including life insurance and disability insurance, health and maternity benefits, provident insurance, pension and skill upgradation, etc. The act amalgamates nine central labour enactments relating to social security.

Background

The bill was introduced by the Labour Minister Santosh Gangwar. The bill was passed by the Lok Sabha 22 September 2020 and the Rajya Sabha on 23 September 2020. The bill was formulated according to the Report and Recommendations of the Second National Commission on Labour.

It consolidated The Employees’ Compensation Act, 1923, The Employees’ State Insurance Act, 1948, The Employees’ Provident Funds and Miscellaneous Provisions Act, 1952, The Employment Exchanges (Compulsory Notification of Vacancies) Act, 1959, The Maternity Benefit Act, 1961, The Payment of Gratuity Act, 1972, The Cine Workers Welfare Fund Act, 1981, The Building and Other Construction Workers Welfare Cess Act, 1996, Unorganised Workers' Social Security Act 2008.

The bill received the presidential assent on 28 September 2020, and section 142 of the Act has come into force on 3 May 2021.

See also

 Occupational Safety, Health and Working Conditions Code, 2020
 Code on Wages, 2019
 Industrial Relations Code, 2020

References

Indian labour law
Social security in India
Acts of the Parliament of India 2020